Potov Vrh is a settlement in the hills east of Novo Mesto in southeastern Slovenia. The area is part of the traditional region of Lower Carniola and is now included in the Southeast Slovenia Statistical Region.

The local church, built on the eastern outskirts of the village, is dedicated to the Holy Trinity and belongs to the Parish of Novo Mesto–Sveti Lenart. It was built in the late 16th century.

References

External links
Potov Vrh on Geopedia

Populated places in the City Municipality of Novo Mesto